Gobionotothen is a genus of marine ray-finned fishes belonging to the family Nototheniidae, the notothens or cod icefishes. They are native to the Southern Ocean.

Taxonomy
Gobionotothen was first formally described in 1976 by the Russian ichthyologist Arkady Vladimirovich Balushkin with the type species designated as Notothenia gibberifrons which was described by the Swedish naturalist Einar Lönnberg in 1905 with its type locality given as South Georgia. Some authorities place this taxon in the subfamily Nototheniinae, but the 5th edition of Fishes of the World does not include subfamilies in the Nototheniidae. The name of the genus is a compound of gobio meaning “goby”, referring to the goby-like form of these species and notothen, indicating that it is a nothothen.

Species
Five recognized species are in this genus:
 Gobionotothen acuta (Günther, 1880) (triangular rockcod)
 Gobionotothen angustifrons (J. G. Fischer, 1885) (narrowhead rockcod)
 Gobionotothen barsukovi Balushkin, 1991
 Gobionotothen gibberifrons (Lönnberg, 1905) (humped rockcod)
 Gobionotothen marionensis (Günther, 1880) (lobe-lip notothen)

Characteristics
Gobionotothen fishes have elongate bodies which are compressed towards the rear. The head has a convex dorsal profile and the space between the eyes is narrow. The mouth is small without a protruding lower jaw and they do not have large canine-like teeth. They have two lateral lines made up of tubed scales. The head is scaly, excep for the snout, lower jaw, the preorbital and the edge if the preoperculum. They have a rounded caudal fin.

Distribution, habitat and biology
Gobionotothen fishes have only been recorded from the northern part of the Antarctic Peninsula and the subantarctic islands. They are benthic predators feeding mainly on benthic invertebrates with some fish eggs and krill taken when available.

Fisheries
Gobionotothen species, particularly G. gibberifrons, are moderately important to commercial fisheries off the South Georgia, South Shetland and South Orkney Islands.

References

Nototheniidae
 
Marine fish genera